Christ Church, founded in 1817, is a historic Episcopal church located at 31st and O Streets, Northwest, Washington, D.C., in the Georgetown neighborhood. Its first rector was Reuel Keith (1792–1842), who with William Holland Wilmer rector of St. Paul's Church in 1818 founded an Education Society to train Episcopal priests. Rev. Keith left this parish in 1820 to accept a position at Bruton Parish Church and teach at the College of William and Mary in Williamsburg, Virginia, although he later returned to the new national capital and taught at the Virginia Theological Seminary when it was founded in 1823.

The current church building, built in 1885–1886, replaced an earlier church building built in 1818. The church building was erected at a cost of $50,000, and it opened on October 28, 1886. It was added to the National Register of Historic Places in 1972.  The building was deemed "a very fine example of late 19th century Gothic".  It has been termed a "miniature cathedral" for its "tall dominating bell tower, its stone Gothic arches and lancet windows.  It is a one-story  structure built of red, smooth-faced brick laid in common bond, with yellow sandstane used for "window sills, buttress caps, corner blocks at gable and dormer ends, door enframements, the north gable finial and cross, gable copings for the main church and aisle dormers (though most of this stonework is covered with a protective sheet of lead), as well as the steps to the doorways."

The building is also a contributing property in the Georgetown Historic District, also listed on the National Register.

During the COVID-19 pandemic in the United States, on March 8, the rector of the church informed parishioners that he was the first Washington, D.C., resident to test positive for the coronavirus.  All services were canceled that Sunday.  According to the assistant to the rector, this was the first time the church had closed since a fire in the 1800s.

See also

National Register of Historic Places listings in Washington, D.C.

References

External links

 

Churches completed in 1886
19th-century Episcopal church buildings
Churches on the National Register of Historic Places in Washington, D.C.
Episcopal churches in Washington, D.C.
Gothic Revival church buildings in Washington, D.C.
Historic district contributing properties in Washington, D.C.
Religious organizations established in 1817
1817 establishments in Washington, D.C.
Churches in Georgetown (Washington, D.C.)